The 2012 United States presidential election in Maine took place on November 6, 2012, as part of the 2012 United States presidential election in which all 50 states plus the District of Columbia participated. Maine voters chose four electors to represent them in the Electoral College via a popular vote pitting incumbent Democratic President Barack Obama and his running mate, Vice President Joe Biden, against Republican challenger and former Massachusetts Governor Mitt Romney and his running mate, Congressman Paul Ryan. Obama and Biden carried Maine with 56.27% of the popular vote to Romney's and Ryan's 40.98%, thus winning the state's four electoral votes.

This is the most recent election when the Democratic candidate won Maine's second congressional district along with a majority of counties in the state, as well as these counties (all of which comprise that district): Androscoggin County, Aroostook County, Franklin County, Oxford County, Penobscot County, Somerset County, and Washington County. This is the last election in which Maine was decided by double digits, as well as the last time it voted to the left of Colorado, New Mexico, and Virginia.

Caucuses

Democratic

Republican

The Republican caucuses were held between Sunday, January 29, and Saturday, March 3, at various locations throughout the state of Maine.  Presidential preference polls (straw polls) were held at the caucuses, but those polls were not binding on the choices of delegates to the Maine Republican Party convention.  The caucuses chose delegates in processes separate from the straw polling.

The state party encouraged all municipal committees to hold their caucuses between February 4 and February 11, although each committee was free to choose a different date. The first caucus was in Waldo County on January 29 and the last one in Castine (Hancock County) on March 3.  On Saturday, February 11, after 84% of precincts had completed voting, state-party officials announced results of straw polls.  The results were revised in a second declaration on February 17 to include previously-missing results from several caucuses. Those statewide totals still did not include the caucuses in Washington County, which had been scheduled for February 11 but postponed to February 18 by predictions of bad weather, nor did they include caucuses originally scheduled to occur between February 16 and March 3. The state Republican Party issued a third statewide compilation on February 24, adding all the February 18 caucuses (scheduled and postponed), but not those for February 16 or March 3.  All three statewide totals showed former Governor Mitt Romney leading Representative Ron Paul by small margins, with other candidates well behind.

At the State Convention held over the weekend of May 5–6, Ron Paul won 20 out of 24 national delegates. One elected delegate, Governor Paul LePage is uncommitted. Of the three delegates qualified by the party offices they already hold, the state party chairman, Charlie Webster is also uncommitted, while the current National Committeeman and Committeewoman are committed to Mitt Romney.

Updated results were released by the Maine GOP on February 24. The new table does not show returns from Rome on February 16 or Castine on March 3, but does include returns from the towns listed above for February 18.

General election

Results

By county

By congressional district
Barack Obama swept both of Maine's two congressional districts.

See also
 United States presidential elections in Maine
 2012 Republican Party presidential primaries
 2012 Republican Party presidential debates and forums
 Results of the 2012 Republican Party presidential primaries
 Maine Republican Party

References

External links
 Official website of the Maine Republican Party
 Rules and By Laws of the Party
 County and Town Republican Committees: Many of these sites show the county or town committee's own tally of presidential caucus results.
 Kennebec County Republican Committee (not linked from the state party's site)
 The Green Papers: for Maine
 The Green Papers: Major state elections in chronological order
 Official Results  for 2012 elections in Maine

 

Maine
United States president
2012